Corina Belcea (born 1975) is a Romanian violinist who resides in Basel, Switzerland.

Biography
She started violin lessons at the age of six. Her teachers in Romania were Radu Bozgan and Ştefan Gheorghiu. In 1991, she took part in the Yehudi Menuhin International Competition for Young Violinists. Yehudi Menuhin then invited her to study at the Yehudi Menuhin School. Her teacher there was Natalia Boyarskaya. She continued her studies at the Royal College of Music. Her teacher there was Felix Andrievsky.

In 1994, while she was studying at the Royal College of Music she founded the Belcea Quartet.

She has also performed as a soloist in venues such as St John's, Smith Square, Queen Elizabeth Hall, Barbican Hall, Purcell Room, Théâtre du Châtelet and Théâtre des Champs-Élysées.

Belcea plays a Pietro Guarneri of Venice violin and owns a contemporary violin made by Felix Daniel Rotaru in 2016.

Competitions and awards
 Joint First Prize, Kloster Schöntal International Competition, Schöntal Abbey, Germany, 1990
 Second Prize, Menuhin Competition, Folkestone, Great Britain. 1995
 Second Prize, International Competition for Young Violinists in Honour of Karol Lipinski and Henryk Wieniawski, Lublin, Poland, 1994
 First Prize, Bromsgrove Festival, 1997
 LASMO Staffa Music Award, 1998

External links
 Biography at the Belcea Quartet official website
 Interview in german at Classicpoint.net

1975 births
Living people
Romanian classical violinists
Alumni of the Royal College of Music
People educated at Yehudi Menuhin School
21st-century classical violinists
Women classical violinists